Steve Mohr (born c. 1954) is an American retired college football coach. He served as the head football coach at Trinity University in San Antonio from 1990 to 2013, compiling a record of 186–74.

Mohr played college football at Denison University in Granville, Ohio, starting for four seasons at offensive tackle and tight end before graduating in 1976. He began his coaching career in 1976 as a graduate assistant at Findlay College—now known as the University of Findlay—in Findlay, Ohio. Mohr earned a master's degree from Bowling Green State University in 1977 and was promoted that year to Findlay's offensive coordinator, a position he held through the 1984 season. He spent five seasons, from 1985 to 1989, as the offensive line coach at Ithaca College in Ithaca, New York, before he was hired by Trinity in April 1990.

Head coaching record

References

Year of birth missing (living people)
1950s births
Living people
American football offensive tackles
American football tight ends
Denison Big Red football players
Findlay Oilers football coaches
Ithaca Bombers football coaches
Trinity Tigers football coaches
Bowling Green State University alumni